Barbara Kussinger (born 1970 in Freising, Upper Bavaria) is a German artist.

In 1999, she studied at Sommerakademie in Salzburg, Austria. In 2006, she graduated from Academy of Fine Arts Munich.

Awards
2007 Villa Romana prize

Solo Shows
2008 Galerie Royal, Munich.
2005 "Evergreen", Bundesgartenschau München
2004 "Zimmer frei", Hotel Mariandl, München
2002 "Just Friends", Klassen Förg und Willikens, Domagkateliers München
2001 Messe "Characters", MOC München

References

External links
 

1970 births
Living people
People from Freising
21st-century German painters
Academy of Fine Arts, Munich alumni